Sønderborg may refer to:
 Sønderborg, Denmark
 Sønderborg Municipality
 Sønderborg Municipality (1970-2006)
 Sønderborg Castle